Unirea may refer to:

Places in Romania 

 Unirea, Alba, a commune
 Unirea, Brăila, a commune
 Unirea, Călărași, a commune
 Unirea, Dolj, a commune and village
 General Berthelot, a commune in Hunedoara, called Unirea from 1965 to 2001
 Jurilovca, a commune in Tulcea, called Unirea from 1983 to 1996
 Unirea (also Wallendorf or Aldorf), a district of Bistrița
 Unirea, a village in Odobești, Vrancea
 Unirea (river), a tributary of the River Mureș in Transylvania
 Unirea Shopping Center, in Unirii Square, Bucharest

Romanian football clubs 

 FC Unirea Alba Iulia, from Alba Iulia, Alba
 FC Unirea Dej, from Dej, Cluj
 CS Unirea Sânnicolau Mare, from Sânnicolau Mare, Timiş
 CS Municipal Unirea Slobozia, from Slobozia, Ialomiţa
 CS Unirea Tărlungeni, a former club from Tărlungeni, Brașov and Ștefăneștii de Jos, Ilfov
 Unirea Tricolor București, from Bucharest
 FC Unirea Urziceni, from Urziceni, Ialomița

Other uses 

 Unirea (newspaper), a newspaper published at Blaj, Transylvania, Romania
 MT Unirea, a 1980 Romanian-flagged crude oil carrier

See also 
 Stadionul Unirea (disambiguation), various stadiums in Romania
 Unirea National College (disambiguation), various educational institutions in Romania